Afrasura crenulata is a moth of the  subfamily Arctiinae. It is found in Angola.

References

Endemic fauna of Angola
crenulata
Insects of Angola
Moths of Africa
Moths described in 1911